is a Japanese politician and a member of the House of Representatives in the Diet.

Overview 

A native of Sapporo, Hokkaidō and graduate of Aoyama Gakuin University, he was elected to the House of Representatives for the first time in 2003 after unsuccessful runs in 1996 and 2000.

In 2010, Matsuki was expelled from the Democratic Party of Japan for voting in favor of a no-confidence motion in then-Prime Minister Naoto Kan. He was expelled from the party the same day and served the rest of the term as an independent. He ran for reelection in 2012 and 2013 as a member of the New Party Daichi, but lost. In 2014 he ran as a candidate of the Japan Innovation Party and gained a Diet seat through the Hokkaido proportional representation block. In 2021 he won the Hokkaido 2nd district as a member of the Constitutional Democratic Party after the LDP incumbent resigned over corruption accusations.

Matsuki is affiliated to the openly revisionist organization Nippon Kaigi.

References

External links 
  in Japanese.

1959 births
Living people
People from Sapporo
Members of the House of Representatives (Japan)
Members of Nippon Kaigi
Democratic Party of Japan politicians
Aoyama Gakuin University alumni
21st-century Japanese politicians